USS Deimos (AK-78) was a  in the service of US Navy in World War II. It was the first ship of the Navy to have borne the name Deimos, after one of the moons of Mars.

Construction
Deimos was laid down 27 November 1942, as liberty ship SS Hugh McCulloch, renamed SS Chief Ouray, MCE hull 513, by Permanente Metals Corporation, Richmond, California, under a Maritime Commission (MARCOM) contract. Deimos was launched on 28 December 1942 and sponsored by Mrs. Marie Moyer. Deimos was transferred to the Navy on 7 January 1943, and commissioned 23 January 1943.

Service history
Deimos sailed from San Francisco 27 January 1943, with cargo for Espiritu Santo, New Hebrides, and Townsville, Australia. She arrived at Nouméa, New Caledonia, 23 May, to load cargo which she delivered to Guadalcanal in June. Returning to her base, she was torpedoed by the Imperial Japanese Navy submarine  on 23 June, on the port side, aft. Efforts to save her failed.

Awards
Deimos received one battle star for World War II service.

References

Bibliography

External links

 

 

Crater-class cargo ships
World War II auxiliary ships of the United States
Shipwrecks in the Solomon Sea
World War II shipwrecks in the Pacific Ocean
Ships built in Richmond, California
1942 ships
Maritime incidents in June 1943
Ships sunk by Japanese submarines
Scuttled vessels